Guerrilla Cambridge (formerly SCE Studio Cambridge) was a British video game developer based in Cambridge, England. The studio was founded under Sony Computer Entertainment in July 1997 through the buyout of the game development division of CyberLife Technology. In 2010, SCE Studio Cambridge was restructured as a sister studio to Guerrilla Games under the name Guerrilla Cambridge and shut down in 2017. The studio is best known for developing the MediEvil series.

History 
On 15 July 1997, Sony Computer Entertainment (SCE) announced that it, through its London-based division, was to acquire the game development division of CyberLife Technology for an undisclosed sum. Founded in 1996, CyberLife had previously developed games under the name "Millennium Interactive", including Creatures, but changed its name early on when developing artificial intelligence technology and "artificial life" simulations became its primary focus. The bought-out team was integrated into a new internal studio for Sony, known as SCE Studio Cambridge. CyberLife would later change its name to Creature Labs in November 1999 before shutting down 2003, with some assets and staff acquired by Gameware Development.

In January 2012, SCE announced a restructuring of its United Kingdom-based studios; within this move, SCE Studio Cambridge became a sister studio to Guerrilla Games to bring Guerrilla's Killzone series to PlayStation Vita. Within the same year, SCE Studio Cambridge assumed the name "Guerrilla Cambridge". An undisclosed number of staffers were let go from Guerrilla Cambridge and other United Kingdom-based studios owned by SCE in March 2014. Guerrilla Cambridge was closed down on 12 January 2017 as a result of a regulatory review process within SCE's Worldwide Studios division.

Games developed

As SCE Studio Cambridge

As Guerrilla Cambridge

References

External links 
 

 
Guerrilla Games
British subsidiaries of foreign companies
1997 establishments in England
2017 disestablishments in England
Companies based in Cambridge
Defunct companies based in Cambridgeshire
PlayStation Studios
Video game companies established in 1997
Video game companies disestablished in 2017
Defunct video game companies of the United Kingdom
Video game development companies